Peterhouse, Marondera may refer to

 Peterhouse Boys' School
 Peterhouse Girls' School